The Texan Meets Calamity Jane also known as Calamity Jane and the Texan in a 1952 re-release, is a 1950 Cinecolor Western movie starring Evelyn Ankers as Calamity Jane and written, produced and directed by Ande Lamb.  The film was Ankers' last movie appearance for ten years.  Shot at the Iverson Movie Ranch, the cinematography was by Karl Struss.

Plot
A western in which Calamity Jane's (Evelyn Ankers) rightful ownership of a gambling hall is challenged. She nearly loses the business to a shady crook, but Texas lawyer Ellion puts up a legal fight to help her stay in charge. After a sensational fight, the letters proving her right are discovered.

Cast
 Evelyn Ankers as Calamity Jane
 James Ellison as Gordon Hastings
 Lee 'Lasses' White as Colorado Charley
 Ruth Whitney as Cecelia Mullen
 Jack Ingram as Matt Baker
 Sally Weldman as Emmy Stokes (as Sally Weidman)
 Rudy De Saxe as Herbert (as Rudy deSaxe)
 Paul Barney as Dave Carter
 Walter Strand as Carlos
 Hugh Hooker as Raoul 
 Ronald Marriott as Nick Dade
 Farrell Lester as Rollo (as Ferrell Lester)
 Elmer Herzberg as Henry the Whistler
 William E. Green as Carlin (as William Green)
 Frank Pharr as Sheriff Atwood
 Bill Orisman as Shotgun Messenger
 Lou Pierce as Elmer (as Lou W. Pierce)
 Raven as Raven - Calamity's Horse

Notes

External links

1950 films
Cinecolor films
Columbia Pictures films
1950 Western (genre) films
American Western (genre) films
Cultural depictions of Calamity Jane
1950s English-language films
1950s American films